This was the first edition of the tournament, Laurynas Grigelis and Mohamed Safwat won the title defeating Thiemo de Bakker and Stephan Fransen in the final 6–4, 6–3.

Seeds

Draw

References
 Main Draw

Morocco Tennis Tour - Casablanca II - Doubles